Mustafa Parmak (born 19 May 1982) is a Turkish/German retired footballer, who mostly played for the German club Stuttgarter Kickers as a midfielder. Further, his height is 172 cm and his weight is 65 kg.

References

External links
 Mustafa Parmak at Kickers-Archiv

1982 births
German people of Turkish descent
Living people
Stuttgarter Kickers II players
Stuttgarter Kickers players
German footballers
3. Liga players
Association football midfielders